Paul Lapeira (born 28 May 2000) is a French cyclist, who currently rides for UCI WorldTeam .

Major results
2018
 1st Stage 2a (TTT) Aubel–Thimister–Stavelot
 2nd Overall Tour des Portes du Pays d'Othe
1st Stage 2 (TTT)
2019
 1st Stage 1 (TTT) Giro della Regione Friuli Venezia Giulia
2021
 1st Il Piccolo Lombardia
 1st Trofeo Città di San Vendemiano
 10th Overall L'Etoile d'Or
2022
 4th Classic Loire Atlantique
2023
 10th Grand Prix de Denain

References

External links

2000 births
Living people
French male cyclists
People from Fougères
Sportspeople from Ille-et-Vilaine
Cyclists from Brittany